Donna Lee Pence (born August 23, 1942, in Joliet, Illinois) was a Democratic Idaho State Representative representing District 25 in the B seat from 2004 to 2016. Pence was also the House Assistant Minority Leader.

Education
Pence earned her bachelor's degree in education from the University of Idaho and her master's degree in health and physical education from Idaho State University.

Elections
Donna Pence chose not to seek reelection in 2016.

2014 
Pence was unopposed for the Democratic primary.

Pence defeated Don Hudson in the general election with 59.4% of the vote.

2012 
Redistricted to District 26, Pence was unopposed for the Democratic primary.

Pence defeated Republican nominee Lee Barron in the general election with 58.9% of the vote.

Pence succeeded Republican Representative Maxine Bell, who was re-districted to District 25.

2010 
Unopposed for the  Democratic primary.

Pence defeated Alex Sutter in the general election with 54.9% of the vote .

2008 
Unopposed for both the Democratic primary and the general election.

2006 
Unopposed for both the Democratic primary and the general election.

2004 
Pence was unopposed in Democratic primary; Ridinger was also unopposed, setting up a rematch.

Pence defeated Ridinger in the general election with 8,790 votes (51.0%).

2002 
When incumbent Republican Representative and Idaho Speaker of the House Bruce Newcomb was re-districted to District 27, Pence was unopposed for the District 25 B seat in the May 28, 2002 Democratic primary.

Pence lost the general election to Republican Representative Tim Ridinger, who had been re-districted from 21B.

References

External links
https://web.archive.org/web/20160210093116/http://www.donnapence.com/
 

1942 births
Living people
Idaho State University alumni
Democratic Party members of the Idaho House of Representatives
People from Gooding, Idaho
People from Joliet, Illinois
University of Idaho alumni
Women state legislators in Idaho
21st-century American politicians
21st-century American women politicians